John Churry (November 26, 1900 – February 8, 1970) was an American professional baseball player and catcher in the Major Leagues for the Chicago Cubs from  to .

Churry appeared in 12 games in his four MLB seasons. He batted a total of 21 times and collected five career hits, with one double, and one run batted in. He also took three bases on balls and posted a batting average of .278. He started three games at catcher and played errorless ball in a total of 37 innings in the field. He retired in 1927 and died in Zanesville, Ohio, at the age of 69.

References

External links

1900 births
1970 deaths
Baseball players from Ohio
Baseball players from Pennsylvania
Chicago Cubs players
London Tecumsehs players
Major League Baseball catchers
Sportspeople from Johnstown, Pennsylvania